This is a list of all (former) Member of the European Parliament for the Socialist Party (SP) from 1989.

Seats in the European Parliament

Alphabetical
Current members of the European Parliament are in bold.
(period is the time they represented the Socialist Party (Netherlands) in the European Parliament.)

European Parliament periods

1989-1994 

0 Seats:

1994-1999 

0 Seats:

1999-2004 

1 Seats:
 Erik Meijer (top candidate)

2004-2009 

2 Seats:
 Kartika Liotard
 Erik Meijer (top candidate)

2009-2014 

2 Seats:
 Dennis de Jong (top candidate) 
 Kartika Liotard

2014-2019 

2 Seats:
 Dennis de Jong (top candidate) 
 Anne-Marie Mineur

2019-2024 

0 Seats:

References

Main